The Passing of Mr. Quin is a 1928 British mystery film which was co-directed by Leslie S. Hiscott and Julius Hagen, starring Clifford Heatherley, Mary Brough and Ursula Jeans. The film was based on the short story The Coming of Mr. Quin, part of the collection The Mysterious Mr. Quin, which was written by Agatha Christie. It was the first British film to be made of one of Christie's works. The short story was adapted by Hiscott, who would in 1931 direct Alibi, the first film to feature Christie's more well known Belgian detective Hercule Poirot. The film was made at Twickenham Studios in London.

Plot

Professor Appleby has terrorised his wife, Eleanor, but when he is murdered, and her lover, Derek goes missing, Eleanor suspects the worst. A mysterious stranger, known as 'Mr Quinny' or 'Mr Quin' appears, and begins to seduce Eleanor, but his alcoholism takes over and he dies.  Before dying, he reveals that he was Derek all along, and offers the girl to a rival, who promises to make Eleanor a happy wife.

Partial cast
Stewart Rome as Dr. Alec Portal 
Trilby Clark as Mrs. Eleanor Appleby 
Ursula Jeans as Vera, the Maid 
Clifford Heatherley as Prof. Appleby 
Mary Brough as Cook 
Vivian Baron as Derek Cappel 
Kate Gurney as Landlady

The screenplay was novelised by G. Roy McRae (thought to be a pseudonym) for issue in 1929. The plot deviates radically from Christie's short story (for example, whereas Christie's Mr Quin is a romantic fantasy figure who solves the mystery of Professor Appleby's suicide, Mr Quin is here portrayed as Appleby's alcoholic murderer).

References

Bibliography
 Low, Rachel. The History of British Film: Volume IV, 1918–1929. Routledge, 1997.

External links

1928 films
British mystery films
British silent feature films
1920s English-language films
Films directed by Leslie S. Hiscott
Films shot at Twickenham Film Studios
Films based on short fiction
Films based on works by Agatha Christie
British black-and-white films
1928 mystery films
1920s British films
Silent mystery films